Tales from the Backseat is the debut studio album by Irish indie rock band The Academic, released on 12 January 2018 by Room 6 Records. It debuted at number 1 on the Irish Albums Chart and received generally favourable critical reception, with the album being nominated for Irish Record of the Year by RTE.

Production

Tales from the Backseat was produced by Tim Pagnotta and recorded in Los Angeles and London. The album was written when the band was in their teens.

Release
On 26 October 2017, the band released a new single "Permanent Vacation" and announced that their debut LP, Tales from the Backseat, would be released on 12 January 2018. Follow up single  "Why Can't We Be Friends?" was selected by Annie Mac at BBC Radio 1 as her Hottest Record in the world which Clash also called it "a crisp, ultra-catchy indie pop jammer."

Reception

Critical reception

Tales from the Backseat was met with generally favourable reviews. The Last Mixed Tape praised the album and described it as "a short sharp shock debut that makes great use of every indie-pop trope available." Clash said the album was "brimming with energy and potential" and likened the album's sound to that of The Strokes and the Yeah Yeah Yeahs. RTÉ.ie also gave the album a positive review, with writer Alan Corr concluding, "The spectre of indie landfill rears up here and there but at a thrifty 33 minutes, The Academic have delivered a short, sharp jab to the aural sweet spot."

Commercial performance
Tales from the Backseat debuted at number 1 on the Irish Albums Chart on its first week of release.

Track listing

Charts

References

External links
 

2018 debut albums
Downtown Records albums
The Academic albums